Three Dollar Bill, Y'all (stylized as Three Dollar Bill, Yall$) is the debut studio album by American rap rock band Limp Bizkit, released on July 1, 1997, by Flip and Interscope Records. It established the band's trademark sound with the singles "Counterfeit", which was influenced by hip hop and heavy metal, and "Faith", a cover of the song of the same name by George Michael. Limp Bizkit's rearrangement of the song incorporated heavier guitar playing by Wes Borland and scratching by DJ Lethal.

Three Dollar Bill, Y'all$ was produced by Ross Robinson, who was introduced to the band through Korn bassist Reginald "Fieldy" Arvizu, who persuaded Robinson to listen to Limp Bizkit's demo. Robinson was impressed by the band's motivation and sound, and agreed to work with them. The album showcased an intentionally abrasive, angry sound which the band felt would attract a fanbase.

Production
Wes Borland left Limp Bizkit preceding a successful performance opening for Korn at the Dragonfly in Hollywood due to a disagreement with Fred Durst, Limp Bizkit signed with Mojo, a subsidiary of MCA Records. While heading to California to record their first album, the band wrecked their van, leading Durst to rehire Borland. After a dispute with Mojo, Limp Bizkit signed with Flip, a subsidiary of Interscope Records.

Reginald Arvizu of the band Korn persuaded Ross Robinson to listen to the band's demo, which consisted of the songs "Pollution", "Counterfeit" and "Stalemate". Robinson finally listened to the tape after it was praised by Robinson's girlfriend. Robinson was impressed by the band's motivation and sound, and produced their debut, which was recorded at Indigo Ranch. During the recording sessions, the band recorded an early version of their song "I'm Broke", but it was decided that the song didn't fit on this album. It was subsequently reworked and recorded for their followup, Significant Other.

Continuing the band's policy of using titles that would hopefully repulse potential listeners, the band named the album by using part of the phrase "queer as a three dollar bill" and adding the word "Y'all" at the end to embody Florida slang into the title, consequently giving the album the name Three Dollar Bill, Y'all.

Music and lyrics 

"Pollution", according to Durst, is about people who say the band's music is "nothing but noise pollution. There's nothing particularly heavy there. No big-time message." In a Q&A, Durst said about the song: "It's like, well, you're preaching and telling me that I'm so wrong—well, that's noise to me because little do you know that my band says a prayer every time before they go on stage and we're not just praying to Buddha or something." 

Limp Bizkit was inspired to write "Counterfeit" after local bands began to copy their style. According to Borland, "They saw this little thing we built [...] and they were like, 'Oh, let's get baggy pants and dress like kind of hip-hoppy and, you know, play heavy metal and rap.' [...] five or six bands just popped up out of nowhere that became these, you know, groups that were trying to sound like us. It was ridiculous. That's where the song 'Counterfeit' came from." Durst said "Counterfeit" is about people who try to fit in and change who they are. 

Fred Durst's problems with his girlfriend inspired him to write the song "Sour". 

The mood and tone set by Robinson in the studio allowed the band to improvise; a recording of the band improvising appeared as the last track on the album, "Everything". The recording of the album also allowed the band to showcase the addition of DJ Lethal, and experimental guitar playing by Borland, who played without a guitar pick, performing with right hand fingers.

On the song "Stuck", Borland used a sustain pedal in the first bar, and muted riffs in the second bar. Borland's playing on this album features octave shapes, and choppy, eighth-note rhythms, sometimes accompanied by muting his strings with his left hand, creating a percussive sound. Borland also made use of unevenly accented syncopated sixteenth notes and hypnotic, droning licks to create a disorienting effect. 

Despite the success of live performances of the band's cover of George Michael's song "Faith", Robinson was opposed to recording the cover, and tried to persuade the band not to play it on the album. However, the final recording, which incorporated heavier guitar playing and drumming, as well as DJ scratching, impressed Robinson. Robinson also bonded with Borland, who Robinson perceived as not taking the band seriously. 

The alternative metal band Tool provided a strong influence in shaping the album's sound, particularly in the song "Nobody Loves Me", which contains a breakdown in which Durst copied the singing of Maynard James Keenan and the intro which has elements of Undertow hidden track "Disgustipated". Durst said "Nobody Loves Me" is about his mother: "When my mom used to ground me and I got upset, she'd say, 'Oh, nobody loves me. I'm going to go eat worms.' So it was like this saying that I used to get pounded with by my mother. She had this little cross-snitch on the wall that said 'Nobody loves me. Everybody hates me. I think I'll go eat worms.' Here's how I look at it: since nobody loves me, I don't owe you a thing." 

"Indigo Flow", named after the studio Three Dollar Bill, Y'all was recorded in (Indigo Ranch Studio), was Limp Bizkit's gratitude toward those who helped the band get a record deal and make music professionally. 

The completed album featured an abrasive, angry sound which Borland later stated was part of Limp Bizkit's plan to get noticed. "The best way to get our message across is through shock value. That's what grabs people [...] getting people to react by showing something negative, hoping something positive will come out of it. Trying to stay in reality." Three Dollar Bill, Y'all has been described as rap metal, nu metal, and rapcore.

Release and promotion 
Three Dollar Bill, Y'all was released by Interscope Records on July 1, 1997. After the album's release, Limp Bizkit opened for Faith No More on the American leg of their Album of the Year Tour, which was the group's final tour before their break up the following year. Despite citing Faith No More as one of their biggest influences, guitarist Wes Borland has spoken of how touring with them in 1997 was a negative experience for the band. He said "The idea of it was cool, we were really excited about it, about the idea of opening for Faith No More. But once we got there, it was a really tough crowd. They have a really tough crowd to please, who are very vocal about not liking you. We opened for Faith No More and Primus in the same year, and the Primus tour went a lot better than the Faith No More tour. I did not get to know Mike Patton on that tour, I got to know him later [through Adam from Tool]." At one show opening for Faith No More, Fred Durst referred to the audience as "faggots" when they started booing Limp Bizkit. Following this show, Durst apologized to Faith No More's keyboardist Roddy Bottum, who unbeknownst to him had come out as gay in the early 1990s. Between March and June 1997, before the album's release, Limp Bizkit had toured North America and Europe with Korn and Helmet, two other artists they cite as influences. This was also Helmet's last tour before their initial break up the following year, with DJ Lethal having earlier collaborated with them on the song "Just Another Victim" when he was in House of Pain. The music video for "Counterfeit" was released in 1997 and was played on music channels like The Box and M2. Limp Bizkit performed on MTV's 1998 Spring Break special Fashionably Loud, which brought the band attention.

The album's popularity grew in 1999 as the band's mainstream profile began to increase. In March of that year, it went platinum in the United States, and it eventually went double platinum in July 2001. As of October 1999, Three Dollar Bill, Y'all sold 1.8 million copies in the United States, according to Nielsen SoundScan. The music video for "Faith" received heavy rotation on MTV and ended up on the popular MTV show Total Request Live.

Controversy
In 1998, controversy erupted when it was revealed Interscope paid $5,000 to guarantee that a Portland radio station play the song "Counterfeit" 50 times, preceded and concluded with an announcement that the air time was paid for by Interscope. The paid air time was criticized by the media, who saw it as "payola". The band's manager Jeff Kwatinetz later termed the plan as a "brilliant marketing move". Durst stated, "It worked, but it's not that cool of a thing." Despite criticism, the paid air time did not increase sales, which stood at only 170,000 in early 1998. Much of the album's resulting sales instead came from consistent touring by the band. Durst directed a music video for the band's single "Faith" in promotion for its appearance in the film Very Bad Things, but was unsatisfied with it, and directed a second video which paid tribute to tourmates like Primus, Deftones and Mötley Crüe, who appeared in the video. This payola controversy hurt Limp Bizkit's image.

Three Dollar Bill, Y'all received controversy for its lyrical content, with the lyrics being labeled often as misogynistic. Durst said: "That's because I said the words whore and bitch. My whole record is about my girlfriend who put me through the ringer for three years and my insecurity about it. It became this big thing." Durst also said: "Somebody may hear the word 'bitch' on our songs, but I love women. I will always be ready for my soul mate to fall into my lap. So those people who think it's derogatory towards women are the people that aren't listening to the words."

Critical reception 

Three Dollar Bill, Y'all$ received mostly positive reviews from critics. A 1997 review from the Gavin Report stated, "Limp Bizkit has created a sound that will fast be incorporated into the hard rock genre—let's call it grindhop. Even if the name doesn't stick, Limp Bizkit will still appeal to anyone with an ear for innovative music." Stephen Thomas Erlewine of Allmusic praised the album in his retrospective review, writing "They might not have many original ideas [...] but they do the sound well. They have a powerful rhythm section and memorable hooks, most of which make up for the uneven songwriting." In The Essential Rock Discography, Martin Charles Strong gave the album a 7 out of 10 rating. Robert Christgau gave the album a negative review. Borland stated in an interview that George Michael, the writer of the song "Faith", hated Limp Bizkit's cover and "hates us for doing it". Durst, however, said: "I heard that he loves the song. We asked him to perform 'Faith' with us on New Year's, but George thought he might come off looking funny. I wouldn't make fun of him." In 2020, Three Dollar Bill, Y'all was named one of the 20 best metal albums of 1997 by Metal Hammer magazine.

Track listing

"Nobody Loves Me" is stylized as "Nobody ♡'s Me" on the back of physical editions.
On some digital editions, the hidden track "Stereotype Me" is omitted from "Faith".

Personnel

Limp Bizkit
 Fred Durst – lead vocals, artwork
 Wes Borland – guitars, backing vocals
 DJ Lethal – turntables, samples, keyboards
 John Otto - drums
 Sam Rivers – bass, backing vocals

Additional musician
 Scott Borland – keyboards on tracks 1, 2, and 6

Production
 Ross Robinson – producer
 Richard Kaplan – engineer
 Andy Wallace – mixing
 Steve Sisco – mixing
 Howie Weinberg – mastering
 Tom Simpson – media
 Jordan Schur – executive producer, A&R
 Tom Whalley – A&R direction
 Jill Rose – A&R coordination
 John Otto (Flip) – layout

Charts

Weekly

Year-end

Certifications

References

1997 debut albums
Albums produced by Ross Robinson
Flip Records (1994) albums
Limp Bizkit albums
Obscenity controversies in music
1998 controversies in the United States